The Philadelphia Zoo, located in the Centennial District of Philadelphia on the west bank of the Schuylkill River, is the first true zoo in the United States. It was chartered by the Commonwealth of Pennsylvania on March 21, 1859, but its opening was delayed by the Civil War until July 1, 1874. The zoo opened with 1,000 animals and an admission price of 25 cents. For a brief time, the zoo also housed animals brought to U.S. from safaris by the Smithsonian Institution, which had not yet built its National Zoo.

The Philadelphia Zoo is one of the premier zoos in the world for breeding animals that are difficult to breed in captivity. The zoo also works with many groups around the world to protect the natural habitats of the animals in their care.

Special features include a children's petting zoo, a paddleboat lake, a rainforest themed carousel, a ropes course, and many interactive and educational exhibits.

History

The opening of the London Zoo to the public in 1847 inspired America's intellectual class to show interest in building a zoo in the U.S. Dr. William Camac of Philadelphia had traveled throughout Europe in the 1850's and visited the London Zoo. Upon returning to the U.S. he advocated to build a Zoo in Philadelphia. On March 21, 1859, the Pennsylvania legislature incorporated the Zoological Society of Philadelphia. The incorporation paper reads: "The purpose of this corporation shall be the purchase and collection of living wild and other animals, for the purpose of public exhibition at some suitable place in the City of Philadelphia, for the instruction and recreation of the people." Camac worked with other Zoological Society members to raise funds and secured 33 acres on the West Philadelphia side of the Schuylkill River previously owned by John Penn, grandson of William Penn. The opening of the Zoo was delayed by the Civil War which lasted from 1861 to 1865.

When the Philadelphia Zoological Garden first opened its Victorian gates on July 1, 1874, to over 3,000 visitors, it was the only institution of its kind in the New World. The zoo began with varied exhibits containing 200 mammals, including buffalo, deer, wolves, foxes, bears, and monkeys, and 67 bird species and 15 reptiles. Reptiles and small mammals were housed in The Solitude, a mansion built by John Penn in 1785. A carriage house was located at the entrance for horses that had transported visitors to the zoo. The landscaping and architecture mimicked a Victorian garden atmosphere that is still represented in the present zoo grounds.

The 1876 Centennial Exposition was held in Fairmount Park, a few blocks from the  zoo. U.S. President Ulysses S. Grant had officiated at the Exposition and visited the zoo on April 23. Zoo attendance increased to nearly 680,000 visitors in 1876, a 36 percent increase over the preceding year, and set a record that would remain unmatched until nearly 858,000 visited in 1951.

The Penrose Research Laboratory was established in 1901. The first of its kind in any zoo, the Penrose Research Lab contributed to a reduced rate of disease, increased vigor, and longevity among zoo animals. In 1901, the lab began performing necropsies on every zoo animal that became ill and died. The lab's history of preventive medicine reflected the foresight of Dr. Charles B. Penrose and Dr. Cortland Y. White, professors at the Medical School of the University of Pennsylvania.

The zoo received railroad visitors at the Zoological Garden station on 34th Street and Girard Avenue from its opening in 1874 until the station was closed in 1902. Since 2013, zoo officials have been working to get the station restored and reopened, to potentially increase attendance and alleviate parking issues on their busiest days.

Philadelphia Zoo has developed a distinguished breeding program over the years and is credited with many "firsts" including: the first successful birth of an orangutan and a chimpanzee in a U.S. zoo in 1928, the first cheetahs born in a zoo in 1956, the first successful birth of an echidna in North America in 1983, and the first successful birth of a giant river otter in North America in 2004. The first recorded parent-reared Guam kingfisher was bred at the zoo in 1985.

Philadelphia Zoo also pioneered the first captive management of flamingos under the direction of curator emeritus John A. Griswold. Through innovative feeding techniques, the zoo was the first to gain the pink and red pigmentation of these birds. The zoo was the first to successfully breed Chilean and greater flamingos in captivity.

The brown tree snake was introduced to the island of Guam in the 1940s, and as a result, bird species endemic to the island were driven to extinction in the wild by the invasive serpent. In 1983, the Guam Bird Rescue Project was spearheaded by the Philadelphia Zoo in an attempt to save the Guam kingfisher and the Guam rail, two native species still present in large enough numbers to benefit from intervention. The rescue plan called for the capture of all kingfishers and rails on Guam, along with the development of a captive management program. The captive breeding was carried out in U.S. zoos in an effort to save the two species from extinction until reintroduction became feasible.

In the early morning of December 24, 1995, a fire in the World of Primates building killed 23 animals, including a family group of six western lowland gorillas, a family group of three orangutans, four white-handed gibbons, and 10 lemurs (two ruffed lemurs, six ring-tailed lemurs, and two mongoose lemurs). All were members of endangered species. The animals died in their sleep from smoke inhalation (carbon monoxide poisoning); none were burned. 10 primates housed in an adjoining building, the Discovery House, survived. At the time of the fire, detection equipment existed in only 20 percent of the zoo buildings; the primates building, which had been constructed in 1985, was not one of them. In the 10 months following the fire, the zoo installed fire detection equipment in all animal buildings.

On July 1, 1999, the zoo opened a new primate exhibit featuring  of indoor and outdoor areas with 10 species of primates, including Sumatran orangutans, western lowland gorillas, lemurs, langurs, and gibbons. In 2006, the zoo opened a new big cat exhibit showcasing lions, Siberian tigers, Amur leopards, snow leopards, cougars, and jaguars in exhibit spaces reminiscent of their natural habitats. On May 30, 2009, the zoo opened a new aviary featuring two birds that are extinct in the wild: the Guam rail and the Guam kingfisher. In July 2009, the last two elephants, both African bush, were relocated to a sanctuary.

In 2010, a special exhibit called Creatures of Habitat was unveiled featuring 10 animal stations throughout the zoo, with endangered animals represented by more than 30 life-size Lego brick statues. The statues were created by Lego-certified professional artist Sean Kenney.

Philadelphia Zoo opened Treetop Trail in 2011, the first component of its Zoo360 animal exploration trail system. Zoo360 is a network of see-through mesh trails, consisting of elevated and ground-level structures, along which animals can explore the zoo away from their enclosures. Subsequent additions to the system include the Great Ape Trail, Big Cat Crossing, Gorilla Treeway, and Meerkat Maze.

On April 13, 2013, the zoo opened KidZooU on the site of the old Pachyderm House. Also known as the Hamilton Family Children's Zoo and Faris Family Education Center, it is one of the largest projects undertaken by the zoo and replaces the old Children's Zoo open for over 50 years prior. KidZooU is notable for many ecologically conscious features, such as rain gardens and cisterns, geothermal wells, and green roofs, making it the first LEED-certified exhibit at the zoo.

On December 29, 2016, Zenda, the oldest African lion in the U.S. zoo population, was euthanized following a sudden loss of appetite and failing health. Zenda was 25. On February 20, 2018, Coldilocks, a 37-year-old polar bear was euthanized after declining health including potential liver and spinal problems. The average age for a polar bear in the wild is 23 years.

Participants wear climbing harnesses. Two courses are available, each designed for a different age group and skill level. A smaller system for children under  is also available.

Features

Zoo360: a first-of-its-kind animal trail system, consisting of five trails—Big Cat Crossing, Gorilla Treeway, Treetop Trail, Great Ape Trail, and Meerkat Maze—which allow the animals to travel along suspended and ground-level mesh structures throughout parts of the zoo.
The Rare Animal Conservation Center: interactive graphics and up-close views of some of the world's most endangered animals including Rodrigues fruit bats, naked mole-rats, blue-eyed black lemurs, golden lion tamarins, François' langurs, and Bolivian gray titi monkeys.
Hamilton Family KidZooU & Faris Family Education Center: a children's zoo with indoor and outdoor exhibits of smaller animals that include petting and feeding opportunities, and educational games.
African Plains: features a southern white rhinoceros, Mhorr gazelles, red river hogs, southern ground hornbills, reticulated giraffes, plains zebras, and hippos.
McNeil Avian Center: an aviary featuring many species of birds, mainly from Africa and the Pacific Islands, including the hamerkop, the Mariana fruit dove, the metallic starling, and the Victoria crowned pigeon, as well as the extinct-in-the-wild Guam kingfisher and Guam rail, and the critically endangered Bali mynah.
Bird Valley: features American flamingos, various species of geese, and trumpeter swans.
Bear Country: features four sloth bears and an Andean bear.
Big Cat Falls: features numerous species of wild cats including African lions, Amur tiger, Amur leopards, snow leopards, and jaguars.
Small Mammal House: features mammalian species such as pygmy loris, meerkat, pygmy marmoset, harvest mouse, dwarf mongoose, Malagasy giant rat, Hoffmann's two-toed sloth, and vampire bat. An outdoor trail system called Meerkat Maze allows the meerkats to travel through mesh tunnels near visitors.
Monkey Junction: includes a pair of black-headed spider monkeys a pair of brown spider monkeys, and squirrel monkeys.
Outback Outpost: includes emus and a mob of red kangaroos.
PECO Primate Reserve: opened in 1999 with primate species including Sumatran orangutans, western lowland gorillas, lar gibbons, and four types of lemurs—aye-aye, black-and-white ruffed, Coquerel's sifaka, and ring-tailed.
Penguin Point: opened in June 2018 as a remodel of the former polar bear habitat, now houses 17 Humboldt penguins.
The Reptile and Amphibian House: features many species of amphibians and reptiles, including giant tortoises, crocodilians, endangered amphibians like the Panamanian golden frog, and the venomous king cobra; also features an outdoor exercise yard for reptiles from June through August, and a special area for the Aldabra and Galápagos tortoises from April through October.
Water is Life: features a family of rare giant otters (the first successfully bred giant otters in North America), red pandas, and a fossa.
Wings of Asia: an outdoor aviary with an Asian garden where guests may hand-feed Asian birds such as golden pheasants, satyr tragopans, Temminck's tragopans, and spotted doves.

Special behind-the-scenes experiences are offered, as well as overnight stays for scout groups, families, and youth groups. A summer concert series and other events occur annually at the zoo, such as Boo at the Zoo (Halloween), the Summer Ale Festival, and the Global Conservation Gala.

Gallery

See also

Association of Zoos and Aquariums
Fairmount Park
Zoo Junction

References

External links

Aerial photographs at the Historic American Buildings Survey
Listing and photographs at the Historic American Buildings Survey

1874 establishments in Pennsylvania
Buildings and structures in Philadelphia
Landmarks in Philadelphia
Tourist attractions in Philadelphia
West Fairmount Park
West Philadelphia
Zoos established in 1874
Zoos in Pennsylvania